EBE or Ebe may refer to:

People 
Given name
 Ebe Stignani (1903–1974), Italian opera singer
 Ebe W. Tunnell (1844–1917), 50th governor of Delaware

Surname
 Thierry Ebe (born 1976), Swiss footballer
 Valerie Ebe (born 1947), Nigerian lawyer

Other uses 
 Ebe (schooner), an Italian training ship
 Extraterrestrial Biological Entity
 "E.B.E." (The X-Files), an episode of The X-Files
 European Bridges Ensemble, a music group